Minister of Population and Ethnic Affairs (also Minister of Population) is a minister in the Estonian Government.

In 2009 this office was abolished. In 2019 this office was re-established.

Ministers

 1997–1999 Andra Veidemann
 1999–2002 Katrin Saks
 2002–2003 Eldar Efendijev
 2003–2007 Paul-Eerik Rummo
 2007–2009 Urve Palo
 2019–2021 Riina Solman

References

Government ministers of Estonia